Systems of Logic Based on Ordinals was the PhD dissertation of the mathematician Alan Turing.

Turing's thesis is not about a new type of formal logic, nor was he interested in so-called ‘ranked logic’ systems derived from ordinal or relative numbering, in which comparisons can be made between truth-states on the basis of relative veracity. Instead, Turing investigated the possibility of resolving the Godelian incompleteness condition using Cantor's method of infinites. This condition can be stated thus—in all systems with finite sets of axioms, an exclusive-or condition applies to expressive power and provability; i.e. one can have power and no proof, or proof and no power, but not both.

The thesis is an exploration of formal mathematical systems after Gödel's theorem.  Gödel showed that for any formal system S powerful enough to represent arithmetic, there is a theorem G which is true but the system is unable to prove.  G could be added as an additional axiom to the system in place of a proof.  However this would create a new system S' with its own unprovable true theorem G', and so on.  Turing's thesis looks at what happens if you simply iterate this process repeatedly, generating an infinite set of new axioms to add to the original theory, and even goes one step further in using transfinite recursion to go "past infinity," yielding a set of new theories Gn, one for each ordinal number n.

The thesis was completed at Princeton under Alonzo Church and was a classic work in mathematics which introduced the concept of ordinal logic.

Martin Davis states that although Turing's use of a computing oracle is not a major focus of the dissertation, it has proven to be highly influential in theoretical computer science, e.g. in the polynomial time hierarchy.

References

External links
 https://rauterberg.employee.id.tue.nl/lecturenotes/DDM110%20CAS/Turing/Turing-1939%20Sysyems%20of%20logic%20based%20on%20ordinals.pdf
 https://www.dcc.fc.up.pt/~acm/turing-phd.pdf
 https://web.archive.org/web/20121023103503/https://webspace.princeton.edu/users/jedwards/Turing%20Centennial%202012/Mudd%20Archive%20files/12285_AC100_Turing_1938.pdf
  
 

History of logic
Systems of formal logic
Alan Turing
Ordinal numbers
Mathematics papers